Nebraska Highway 92 is a highway that enters the state from Nebraska's western border at the Wyoming state line west of Lyman, Nebraska, to the state's eastern border on the South Omaha Veterans Memorial Bridge over the Missouri River in Omaha, where it enters Iowa. Nebraska Highway 92 passes, follows, or runs through a number of the state's principal attractions, including Scotts Bluff National Monument, the Oregon Trail, Chimney Rock National Historic Site, Ash Hollow State Historical Park, Lake McConaughy, the Nebraska Sand Hills, and the City of Omaha. It is the only Nebraska Highway to run from the west border to the east border of Nebraska; along the way it crosses the Platte River or its tributary North Platte River a total of five times.

Route description

N-92 begins at the Wyoming border west of Lyman and after a brief turn south, heads east passing around the north side of Scotts Bluff National Monument, crosses the North Platte River for the first of three times, and enters the town of Scottsbluff. Starting in Scottsbluff, N-92, US 26, and the North Platte River form a three-way braid, crisscrossing one another several times for  until Lewellen. At Scottsbluff, it overlaps US 26 and N-71, crossing the North Platte River again to its south side, to Gering, where it then turns to the east-southeast, following the route of the Oregon Trail, paralleling the North Platte River and US 26 on the other side of the river.  Near Chimney Rock National Historic Site, it overlaps US 26 again until Bridgeport.  After a brief concurrency with US 385, it goes southeast until it crosses the North Platte for the third time just before Broadwater.  It then again overlaps US 26 a third time from there until Lewellen, where it separates to go through the resort communities along the north shore of Lake McConaughy until it meets N-61.

It overlaps Highway 61 and goes north into the Sand Hills and separates in Arthur.  It then goes east, meeting N-97 in Tryon, and encountering  N-2 at Merna. It then goes southeast with Highway 2 through Broken Bow and separates at Ansley.  It then runs east through Loup City and meets with US 281 in St. Paul.

It runs concurrently with US 281 through St. Paul, crosses the Loup River, and then separates from US 281 and goes straight east, intersects US 30, crosses the Platte River for the first of two times near Clarks and meets US 81 west of Osceola.  It is then concurrent with US 81 through Osceola and Shelby, before separating east of Shelby.  It then passes through Rising City and then goes straight east until it meets US 77 southwest of Wahoo, Nebraska.  It passes through Wahoo concurrent with US 77 and goes east with US 77 until they separate near Mead.  After passing the south edge of Yutan, it recrosses the Platte River.

It then encounters US 275, with which it is concurrent for the rest of its distance in Nebraska.  Shortly after meeting US 275, it crosses the Elkhorn River and becomes a 4 lane divided expressway shortly before meeting US 6 and N-31. Within Omaha, it meets Interstate 80 and US 75.  The street designations for N-92 in Omaha, going west to east, are West Center Road, Industrial Road, L Street and Missouri Avenue. It remains a four-lane suburban arterial street until it enters Iowa on the South Omaha Veterans Memorial Bridge over the Missouri River.

History
Originally, Route 92 followed the route of the old Oregon Trail through Mitchell Pass in Scotts Bluff National Monument, and then through Downtown Gering. It was later rerouted on a more level route around the north side of Scotts Bluff, through the town of Scottsbluff.
Between 1936 and 1973, Nebraska Highway 92 was concurrent with U.S. Highway 30A from Clarks to Omaha.

Major intersections

References

External links

 Nebraska Transportation On New Bridge
 Nebraska Highways 61 to 100
 

092
Transportation in Scotts Bluff County, Nebraska
Transportation in Morrill County, Nebraska
Transportation in Garden County, Nebraska
Transportation in Keith County, Nebraska
Transportation in Arthur County, Nebraska
Transportation in McPherson County, Nebraska
Transportation in Logan County, Nebraska
Transportation in Custer County, Nebraska
Transportation in Sherman County, Nebraska
Transportation in Howard County, Nebraska
Transportation in Merrick County, Nebraska
Transportation in Polk County, Nebraska
Transportation in Butler County, Nebraska
Transportation in Saunders County, Nebraska
Transportation in Douglas County, Nebraska
Transportation in Omaha, Nebraska
Oregon Trail